Great Henny is a village and civil parish near Sudbury, in the Braintree district, in the county of Essex, England. Nearby settlements include the villages of Little Henny and Twinstead. The hamlet of Henny Street, within the parish, is on the River Stour which forms the parish's eastern border.

Location 
In 1870 the parish was described as "on the river Stour and the Sudbury railway, at the boundary with Suffolk, 2 miles S of Sudbury r. station. Post town, Sudbury."

St Mary's Church
St Mary's Church is the only church within the parish, and is the Church of St Mary the Virgin. The church is thought to have first been built in the 11th or 12th century and then later extended in the 14th century. The church is also registered as a Small Place of Pilgrimage. It is a Grade II* listed building.

Housing 
In the parish of Great Henny, information has showed that there has always been a small amount of housing in the area, with the highest number of houses between 1831 and 1961, according to census information, being 88 in 1851. This number had slowly increased from 1831 however after 1851, the number of houses within the area began to slowly decrease and the census information in 1961 showed that in total there were 58 total houses in the area. This number had increased again, to 72 by the latest census which was taken in 2011.

Population 
According to the 2011 census, the population of Great Henny in that year was 191 people. Census data tells us that the population of Great Henny has not fluctuated majorly over the past 200 years since  1811, when census data is available for Great Henny. Over each ten-year period when the census was taken between 1811 and 1951, the population decreased every year except from the year 1951 when the population increased by 3. During every other census, however, the population was seen to decrease, with the largest decline being in 1901, when the population had decreased by 78 from the previous census. The total number of houses within the area can be seen to have decreased within the period of 1831–1961, when this data is available. In 1861, the total number of houses was 83, and while this remained steady and actually increased to 88 in 1881, the total number of households was seen to decrease every ten years when the census was taken and in 1961 there were only 58 houses in the area. This number, however, is an increase upon the lowest number of 43 houses which was in 1931. The decrease in the number of houses could be linked to the decreasing population during these times.

Employment 

In 1831, the majority of males over the age of 20 (73% of employed males) were agricultural labourers. The next leading occupation, although only at approximately 6%, was males employed in retail and handicrafts. Still in 1881, the majority of workers worked in agriculture, followed by general or unspecified commodities. At this time however, there are also records of females being employed although records show that the majority of females worked in  an "unknown occupation." Many females also worked in dress or domestic services or offices.
According to the 2011 census, however, only 5 people were working in the agriculture, forestry and fishing industries. The three most popular employment categories were:  professional, scientific and technical activities employing a total of 20 people, construction employing a total of 14 people followed by manufacturing providing employment for 11 people. This shows how the area and industry within the area has developed over the past 200 years.

References

Further reading 
 Listed buildings in Great Henny

External links

Villages in Essex
Civil parishes in Essex
Braintree District